The Qatar men's national squash team represents Qatar in international squash team competitions, and is governed by Qatar Squash Federation.

Current team
 Abdulla Al-Tamimi
 Syed Azlan Amjad
 Abdulrahman Al-Malki
 Abdulwahab Al-Ishaq

Results

World Team Squash Championships

Asian Squash Team Championships

See also 
 Qatar Squash Federation
 World Team Squash Championships

References 

Squash teams
Men's national squash teams
Squash
Men's sport in Qatar